Marcel Elphège "Little Beaver" Dionne (born August 3, 1951) is a Canadian former professional ice hockey centre who played 18 seasons in the National Hockey League (NHL) for the Detroit Red Wings, Los Angeles Kings and New York Rangers between 1971 and 1989. A prolific scorer, he won the art Ross Trophy as the NHL's leading scorer in 1979–80, and recorded 50 goals or more in a season 6 times, and 100 points or more in a season 8 times during his career. Internationally Dionne played for the Canadian national team at two Canada Cups and three World Championships. Dionne was inducted into the Hockey Hall of Fame in 1992. In 2017 Dionne was named one of the '100 Greatest NHL Players' in history.

Junior career 

Dionne played in the 1962, 1963 and 1964 Quebec International Pee-Wee Hockey Tournaments with his Drummondville youth team. Dionne's first junior season was in 1968 for the Drummondville Rangers of the former Quebec Junior Hockey League, in which he scored over two goals a game in Drummondville's losing effort in the Memorial Cup playoffs.

When the Quebec Major Junior Hockey League formed in 1969, Dionne departed to play in the Ontario Hockey Association, then regarded as a higher-calibre level of competition, spending the next three seasons with the St. Catharines Black Hawks.  He became the league's preeminent star, winning scoring titles in 1970 and 1971 and adding a record 122 points in 43 playoff games.   
Dionne's scoring feats were marred by one of the most infamous events in Canadian junior hockey during the 1971 Richardson Cup finals against the Quebec Remparts.  Following a riot in Quebec City after the penalty-filled fourth game of the series in which Dionne's Black Hawks' team bus was attacked by the mob, the fifth game was played at a neutral site, and the remainder of the series was not played due to fears of further violence.

Dionne finished his junior career by shattering the OHA's career scoring record, which was not broken until Dale McCourt did so in the 1977 season.  He was subsequently drafted in the first round (second overall, behind Rempart rival Guy Lafleur) by the Detroit Red Wings in the 1971 NHL Entry Draft.

NHL career

Detroit Red Wings 
Dionne played his first four seasons with the Red Wings, where he was one of the few stars on an otherwise stagnant team that failed to make the playoffs.

Los Angeles Kings 
Despite having teammates such as Alex Delvecchio and Mickey Redmond, Dionne's frustrations with losing were evident. His agent, Alan Eagleson pushed for more money. The owner of the Los Angeles Kings, Jack Kent Cooke, offered Dionne $300,000 per year. A deal was struck with the Red Wings and Dionne was traded for Terry Harper, Dan Maloney, cash, and draft picks; Dionne then signed with the Kings on June 23, 1975 and became their franchise player. At the time, it was the richest deal in hockey history.

During Dionne's time with the Los Angeles Kings, he played eleven and a half seasons and formed the famed "Triple Crown Line", centring Charlie Simmer and Dave Taylor. Despite Dionne's production during the regular season, he was frustrated with the Kings' lack of playoff success; they made the postseason from 1976–82 but only advanced to the second round three times for a total of 43 playoff games. During the 1986–87 season, Dionne mentored the rookies of the Kings as Mickey Redmond had mentored him during his rookie years in Detroit. He took eventual Calder Trophy winner Luc Robitaille, Jimmy Carson and Steve Duchesne under his wing.

Despite the rapport with the rookies, there was also a falling out with coach Pat Quinn; moreover, the aging Kings were on track to miss the playoffs. Dionne did not want to be part of a rebuilding project and either wanted an immediate upgrade to the roster or a trade to a contender. He was traded to the New York Rangers on March 10, 1987; the Kings did reach the playoffs in the season he was traded.

New York Rangers 
Dionne played his remaining two and a half seasons there, where the Rangers lost in the first round of the playoffs twice and missed the playoffs once. He retired in 1989.

Retirement 
In January 2004, Dionne was featured on a Canadian postage stamp. As part of the NHL All-Stars Collection, Dionne was immortalized along with five other All-Stars.

Dionne has homes in Niagara Falls, Ontario and Clarence Center, New York. He has maintained a large business and investment portfolio since his playing days, owning the Blue Line Diner in Niagara Falls, operating a sports memorabilia store in Buffalo and buying and selling real estate.

Achievements 
During Dionne's first season for Detroit in 1972, he set an NHL record for scoring by a rookie with 77 points.  This record has since been surpassed.

Dionne's best season was 1979–80 when he had 137 points. That season, he was tied for the league lead in points with Wayne Gretzky. He was awarded the Art Ross Trophy for scoring two more goals than Gretzky, the only time he won the award. Dionne also won the Ted Lindsay Award (formerly called the Lester B. Pearson Award) in 1979 and 1980, and the Lady Byng Trophy in 1975 and 1977.

Dionne was the third of eight men to reach the 700-goal plateau, and currently ranks sixth among all-time goal scorers, with 731. He is ranked sixth in points, with 1771. He is tenth in career assists with 1,040. He was second in assists, goals, and points when he retired in 1989 (he is 70 goals, 9 assists, and 79 points behind Gordie Howe in all categories).  Dionne is the highest-scoring player to have never won the Stanley Cup.

He was also the last active player in the NHL to have participated in the 1972 Summit Series. Despite not playing in the 1972 Summit Series, he did play for Team Canada in the 1976 Canada Cup and the 1981 Canada Cup. For the 1976 Canada Cup, his linemates were Bobby Hull and Phil Esposito. He was also on a line with Lanny McDonald and Darryl Sittler and they were on the ice when the tournament winning goal was scored. While on the 1981 team, he was on a line with Wayne Gretzky and Guy Lafleur. Dionne also won a bronze medal in the 1978, 1983 and 1986 World Ice Hockey Championships. In the 1978 edition, he was named the top forward.

Dionne is third in the NHL for most 100+ point seasons. He has had eight 100+ point seasons in his NHL career, only behind Wayne Gretzky's fifteen 100+ point seasons and Mario Lemieux's ten 100+ point seasons.

Dionne was inducted into the Hockey Hall of Fame in 1992. In 1998, he was ranked number 38 on The Hockey News' list of the 100 Greatest Hockey Players, the highest-ranking player to have not won a Stanley Cup since 2001 when No. 14-ranked Ray Bourque won with the Colorado Avalanche. Dionne had not come close to doing so, as he never advanced beyond the second round of the playoffs. When the Los Angeles Kings finally reached the Stanley Cup finals in 1993, after advancing to and winning their first conference finals, Dionne gave Dave Taylor a congratulatory call.

The former Centre Civique arena in Drummondville was renamed Centre Marcel Dionne in his honour after his retirement.

Dionne's younger brother Gilbert also played in the NHL and won a Stanley Cup with the Montreal Canadiens in 1993. Gilbert is Marcel's junior by nineteen years.

Prior to the start of the 1993–94 season, Dionne helped to create local interest in the ECHL's newest franchise, the South Carolina Stingrays. With the help of some young players, Dionne gave an on-ice demonstration of the rules of hockey to the southern audience.

Dionne currently resides in Niagara Falls, Ontario, and owns Marcel Dionne Enterprises. He is an occasional member of the Buffalo Sabres Alumni Hockey Team despite never playing, or living there as a player. He is also a Royal Ambassador for the Kings organization.

Career statistics

Regular season and playoffs

International

Awards and honours

OHA
 1969–70 – Eddie Powers Memorial Trophy Winner
 1969–70 – OHA Second All-Star Team
 1970–71 – OHA First All-Star Team
 1970–71 – Eddie Powers Memorial Trophy Winner

NHL
 1974–75 – Lady Byng Trophy Winner
 1974–75 – Played in NHL All-Star Game
 1975–76 – Played in NHL All-Star Game
 1976–77 – Lady Byng Trophy Winner
 1976–77 – NHL first team All-Star
 1976–77 – Played in NHL All-Star Game
 1977–78 – Named Best Forward at the World Hockey Championships
 1977–78 – Played in NHL All-Star Game
 1978–79 – NHL second team All-Star
 1978–79 – Lester B. Pearson Award Winner
 1979–80 – NHL first team All-Star
 1979–80 – Lester B. Pearson Award Winner
 1979–80 – Art Ross Trophy Winner
 1979–80 – Played in NHL All-Star Game
 1980–81 – NHL second team All-Star
 1980–81 – Played in NHL All-Star Game
 1982–83 – Played in NHL All-Star Game
 1984–85 – Played in NHL All-Star Game
 1992 – Inducted into the Hockey Hall of Fame

See also 
 List of NHL statistical leaders
 Notable families in the NHL
 List of NHL players with 1000 points
 List of NHL players with 500 goals

References

External links 
 
 Marcel Dionne's Official Homepage

1951 births
Living people
Art Ross Trophy winners
Canadian ice hockey centres
Denver Rangers players
Detroit Red Wings captains
Detroit Red Wings draft picks
Detroit Red Wings players
Drummondville Rangers players
French Quebecers
Hockey Hall of Fame inductees
Ice hockey people from Quebec
Lady Byng Memorial Trophy winners
Lester B. Pearson Award winners
Lester Patrick Trophy recipients
Los Angeles Kings players
National Hockey League All-Stars
National Hockey League first-round draft picks
National Hockey League players with retired numbers
New York Rangers players
People from Clarence, New York
Sportspeople from Drummondville
St. Catharines Black Hawks players